The Piano Concerto No. 23 in A major K. 488 is a concerto for piano and orchestra written by Wolfgang Amadeus Mozart. It was finished, according to Mozart's own catalogue, on March 2, 1786, two months prior to the premiere of his opera, Le nozze di Figaro, and some three weeks prior to the completion of his next piano concerto. It was one of three subscription concerts given that spring and was probably played by Mozart himself at one of these.

The concerto is scored for piano solo and an orchestra consisting of one flute, two clarinets, two bassoons, two horns and strings.


Structure 
The piano concerto has three movements and typically lasts for about 26 minutes:

The first movement is in A major and is in sonata form. The piece begins with a double exposition, the first played by the orchestra, and the second when the piano joins in. The first exposition is static from a tonal point of view and is quite concise, the third theme is not yet revealed. The second exposition includes the soloist and is modulatory. It also includes the previously unheard third theme. The second exposition is ornamented as opposed to the first exposition which is not. The second theme has harmonic tension. This is expressed by dissonances that are played on the beat, and then solved by an interval of a descending second. This is also expressed in the use of chromatics in the melody and bass lines which is a source of harmonic tension, as the listeners anticipate the arrival of the tonic.

The slow second movement, in ternary form, is somewhat operatic in tone. The piano begins alone with a theme in Siciliano rhythm characterized by unusually wide leaps. This is the only movement by Mozart in F minor. The dynamics are soft throughout most of the piece. The middle of the movement contains a brighter section in A major announced by flute and clarinet that Mozart would later use to introduce the trio "Ah! taci ingiusto core!" in his 1787 opera Don Giovanni.

The third movement is a sonata-rondo. It is shaded by moves into other keys as is the opening movement (to C major from E minor and back during the secondary theme in this case, for instance) and with a central section whose opening in F-sharp minor is interrupted by a clarinet tune in D major, an intrusion that, according to Girdlestone, reminds one that instrumental music at the time was informed by opera buffa and its sudden changes of point of view as well as of scene.

References

External links

23
1786 compositions
Compositions in A major